Aibl was a municipality in Austria which merged in January 2015 into Eibiswald in the Deutschlandsberg District in the Austrian state of Styria.

Population

References

Cities and towns in Deutschlandsberg District